Natalia Sergeyevna Ishchenko (born 8 April 1986) is a retired Russian synchronized swimmer, five-times Olympic champion and nineteen-times world champion. 

Ishchenko announced her retirement from sports in April 2017. Since November 2017, she has served as Vice Minister of Sports of Kaliningrad Oblast.

Career

Natalia was a member of the Russian gold medal team in 2008, 2012 and 2016. She also won gold in the women's duet at the 2012 and 2016 Summer Olympics with Svetlana Romashina. 

Natalia took a break from the sport in 2013 after giving birth to her son. She returned in 2015, winning both the women's duet and team events at the European Synchro Cup in Haarlemmermeer, qualifying for the 2016 Summer Olympics in Rio de Janeiro.

References

1986 births
Living people
Russian synchronized swimmers
Olympic synchronized swimmers of Russia
Olympic medalists in synchronized swimming
Olympic gold medalists for Russia
Synchronized swimmers at the 2008 Summer Olympics
Synchronized swimmers at the 2012 Summer Olympics
Synchronized swimmers at the 2016 Summer Olympics
Medalists at the 2008 Summer Olympics
Medalists at the 2012 Summer Olympics
Medalists at the 2016 Summer Olympics
World Aquatics Championships medalists in synchronised swimming
Synchronized swimmers at the 2005 World Aquatics Championships
Synchronized swimmers at the 2007 World Aquatics Championships
Synchronized swimmers at the 2009 World Aquatics Championships
Synchronized swimmers at the 2011 World Aquatics Championships
Synchronized swimmers at the 2015 World Aquatics Championships
European Aquatics Championships medalists in synchronised swimming
Sportspeople from Smolensk
Immanuel Kant Baltic Federal University alumni